Cromus is a genus of phacopid trilobites in the family Encrinuridae, that existed during the upper Silurian in what is now the Czech Republic. The genus was described by Barrande in 1852, and the type species is C. intercostatus. It also contains the species C. canorus.

The type specimen was described from the Kopanina Formation.

References

External links
 Cromus at the Paleobiology Database

Silurian trilobites of Europe
Encrinuridae genera
Fossils of the Czech Republic
Paleozoic life of the Northwest Territories